The Warrington Guardian is a local newspaper that has been published in Warrington, England, since 1853, originally published weekly on Saturdays. In 1856 it was bought by Alexander Mackie, who used it as a springboard to establish a number of other "Guardian" titles in Cheshire: the Northwich Guardian in 1861, the Altrincham Guardian in 1862, the Crewe Guardian in 1863, and the Chester Guardian in 1867. By 1859 the Warrington Guardian had a circulation of 2200. As of 2013 the paper is owned by Newsquest.

References

Citations

Bibliography

1853 establishments in England
Newspapers published by Newsquest
Newspapers published in Cheshire
Publications established in 1853
Warrington